IT band may refer to:
 Intervalence charge transfer
 Iliotibial tract